The 1920 United States House of Representatives elections were elections for the United States House of Representatives to elect members to serve in the 67th United States Congress. They were held for the most part on November 2, 1920, while Maine held theirs on September 13. They coincided with the election of President Warren G. Harding, the first time that women in all states were allowed to vote in federal elections after the passage of the 19th Amendment.

The incumbent Democratic administration of Woodrow Wilson lost popularity after the conclusion of World War I in 1918, as American voters hoped to return to isolationism and avoid military conflict in the future. Heedless of the prevailing national mood, Wilson advocated American leadership in a new international order under the League of Nations, alienated voters of German and Irish ancestry, and constantly struggled with a Congress controlled by the opposition Republican Party. Harding and the Republicans promised a new start for the nation and a disassociation from Europe's political troubles that most voters found appealing. As a result, the Republicans picked up 63 seats in the House of Representatives, with most of the gains coming from Democratic-leaning districts in the big industrial cities and the border states. Many of these districts elected Republican representatives for the only time in decades, and House Democratic leader Champ Clark was among those who lost reelection. Although the South remained solidly Democratic for the most part, the Republicans secured more than 90% of the seats outside the South, which gave them their largest majority of the 20th century and as of 2023, their greatest number of seats ever. The 67th Congress is the most recent in which the Republican Party won greater than a two-thirds majority of seats in either chamber.

Election summaries

Source: Election Statistics - Office of the Clerk

Special elections

Alabama

Arizona

Arkansas

California

Colorado

Connecticut

Delaware

Florida

Georgia

Idaho

Illinois

Indiana

Iowa

Kansas

Kentucky

Louisiana

Maine

Maryland

Massachusetts

Michigan

Minnesota

Mississippi

Missouri

Montana

Nebraska

Nevada

New Hampshire

New Jersey

New Mexico

New York

North Carolina

North Dakota

Ohio

Oklahoma

Oregon

Pennsylvania

Rhode Island

South Carolina

South Dakota

Tennessee

Texas

Utah

Vermont

Virginia

Washington

West Virginia

Wisconsin

Wyoming

Non-voting delegates

Alaska Territory

See also
 1920 United States elections
 1920 United States presidential election
 1920 United States Senate elections
 66th United States Congress
 67th United States Congress

Notes

References

Bibliography

External links
 Office of the Historian (Office of Art & Archives, Office of the Clerk, U.S. House of Representatives)